Jim Cassidy was a Scottish footballer who played most of his career as a centre-forward for Bolton Wanderers in the late 19th century.

Cassidy was born in Kilmarnock on 2 December 1869 and started his football career at Kilmarnock, before moving on to Glasgow Hibernian.

In 1889, Cassidy joined Bolton where he remained (with short spells with Carfin Shamrock and Celtic) for 9 seasons, making 219 appearances, scoring 101 goals.

In an FA Cup tie against Sheffield United on 1 February 1890, Cassidy scored 5 goals in a 13–0 rout, with a further 4 goals coming from Davie Weir.

Cassidy also scored Bolton's consolation goal in the 1894 FA Cup Final – Bolton were 4-0 down to Notts County when, with three minutes to play, County's goalkeeper George Toone came out to meet a Bolton attack only to slip while attempting to clear and leave Cassidy with one of the easiest cup final goals of all time.

Honours
Bolton Wanderers

FA Cup finalist: 1894

1869 births
Footballers from East Ayrshire
Year of death missing
Scottish footballers
Bolton Wanderers F.C. players
Kilmarnock F.C. players
Celtic F.C. players
Association football forwards
FA Cup Final players